Krościenko  is a village in the administrative district of Gmina Ustrzyki Dolne, within Bieszczady County, Subcarpathian Voivodeship, in south-eastern Poland, near the border with Ukraine.

The village has a population of 590.

References

Poland–Ukraine border crossings
Villages in Bieszczady County